"Fortunate" is a neo soul  song from the 1999 motion picture Life and was released on the film's soundtrack. The song was written, composed, produced and arranged by R. Kelly and recorded by Maxwell. "Fortunate" was awarded Best R&B Single of the Year at the Billboard Music Award and Best R&B/Soul Single (Male) at Soul Train Music Awards. Maxwell was nominated for a Grammy for Best R&B Male Vocalist and also nominated for a Blockbuster Entertainment Awards for Favorite Song of the Year.

The song, Maxwell's biggest hit to date, spent eight weeks at number one on the US R&B chart and peaked at number four on the Billboard Hot 100. It is his first number-one R&B hit, eventually followed by "Pretty Wings" in 2009.

According to R. Kelly, Maxwell didn't want to sing "Fortunate". Instead, he wanted to sing the song "Life" - which Kelly gave to K-Ci & JoJo. Kelly rejected Maxwell's idea because he felt that the neo-soul singer wouldn't have been believable singing a song from the perspective of a prison inmate.

Charts

Weekly charts

Year-end charts

Certifications

|}

See also
 R&B number-one hits of 1999 (USA)

References

1999 singles
Songs written by R. Kelly
Songs written for films
Music videos directed by Francis Lawrence
1998 songs
Columbia Records singles
Song recordings produced by R. Kelly
Maxwell (musician) songs
Contemporary R&B ballads
Soul ballads
1990s ballads